Đurđina Malović (born 5 May 1996) is a Montenegrin handball player for Toulon MVH and the Montenegrin national team.

She represented Montenegro at the 2013 World Women's Handball Championship in Serbia and the 2014 European Women's Handball Championship in Hungary and Croatia.

References

External links

Montenegrin female handball players
1996 births
Living people
Sportspeople from Nikšić